István Horváth (born 1935) is a former Hungarian communist politician.

István Horváth may refer to:

 István Horváth (politician, born 1970), Mayor of Szekszárd, Hungary
 István T. Horváth (born 1953), Hungarian-American chemist
 István Horváth (athlete) (1910–1976), Hungarian athlete
 István Horváth (physicist) (born 1963), Hungarian physicist, astronomer